Isaac Spooner (c.1735–1816) was an English ironmaster and banker who founded Birmingham Bank.

Life
Spooner was born to Abraham Spooner and Anne Knight, he went into the family iron business based around a furnace at Aston, in the Birmingham area. In 1791 he founded a bank with Matthias Attwood the elder, known then as the Birmingham Bank, which became the largest private bank in Birmingham with a clientele mostly consisting of farmers and manufacturers. In 1801, Birmingham Bank opened a London branch called Spooner, Attwood & Holman. The bank Attwood, Spooner & Co. failed in 1865. 

Spooner's views were evangelical and abolitionist. He owned an estate of over 2000 acres at Elmdon, West Midlands, where he completed Elmdon Hall, a development begun by his father Abraham in 1795, and which stood until its demolition in 1956. Elmdon Park remains in its place.

Family
Spooner married Barbara Gough, daughter of Sir Henry Gough, 1st Baronet, sister of Henry Gough-Calthorpe, 1st Baron Calthorpe and granddaughter of the MP Reynolds Calthorpe. They had children including:

Abraham, who married the daughter of Luke Lillingston (great-nephew and heir of General Luke Lillingston) of Ferriby Grange, and took the name Abraham Spooner Lillingston.
Isaac, who married Miss Tyler of Redland in 1807.
Barbara Ann, who married William Wilberforce.
Anne, who married Edward Vansittart, son of George Vansittart and Vicar of Taplow, as his second wife, and was mother of Edward Vansittart Neale.
Henry, who attended Rugby School.
William, who became Archdeacon of Coventry.
Richard, who was a member of parliament. He married Charlotte, daughter of Nathan Wetherell.
John, who was a clergyman.

There were nine in all, with the unmarried Eliza; or ten. Richard is said to be the ninth child in an 1885 Life of Thomas Attwood.

Notes

External links
landedfamilies.blogspot.co.uk, Alston of Elmdon Hall

1735 births
1816 deaths
English businesspeople
English bankers
English evangelicals
People from Birmingham, West Midlands